Abaza may refer to:

Places
Abazinia, a region in the Caucasus
Abaza Urban Okrug, a municipal formation into which the Town of Abaza in the Republic of Khakassia, Russia is incorporated
Abaza (town), a town in the Republic of Khakassia, Russia

Other uses
Abaza people, an ethnic group of the Caucasus
Abaza language, a Northwest Caucasian language
Abaza family, an Egyptian family
Abaza (surname)
Abaza Pasha (disambiguation)
Abaza goat, a Turkish breed of domesticated goat
Abaza TV, a television station in the Republic of Abkhazia
Abaza (TV series), an Egyptian animated show